Frederic Richard Lees (15 March 1815 – 29 May 1897) was an English temperance advocate and vegetarian.

Biography

Lees was born in Meanwood, near Leeds. Lees signed the antispirits pledge in 1832 and became teetotaller in 1835. He worked as a teetotalism activist and authored books on the subject. In 1837, he became the Secretary for the British Association for the Promotion of Temperance (British Temperance League) and edited its journal from 1840–1844. He edited Truth-Seeker from 1844–1850, the Teetotal Topic in 1847 and the Temperance Spectator in 1859.

He was a founding member of the United Kingdom Alliance in 1863. Lees was a vegetarian and occasionally lectured on vegetarianism. In 1857, he won a Vegetarian Society essay competition which was republished in 1884. He became an associate member of the Vegetarian Society in 1874.

Lees obtained an honorary doctorate from University of Giessen for his writings against Owenism. Lees married Mary Jowett in 1838, they had two children; she died in 1870. In 1878, he married Sarah Barnesley (née Brooks), who died in 1889.

Lees died on 29 May 1897, in Halifax, West Yorkshire.

Selected publications

Owenism Dissected (1838)
An Argument on Behalf of the Primitive Diet of Man (1857)
Essays Physiological and Critical on the Principles of Temperance (1857)
National Temperance Testimonial of One Thousand Guineas to Dr. Frederic Richard Lees (1860)
An Inquiry into the Reasons and Results of the Prescription of Intoxicating Liquors in the Practice of Medicine (1866)
Textbook of Temperance (1869)
The Science Temperance Text-Book (1884)
The Temperance Movement and its Workers: A Record of Social, Moral, Religious, and Political Progress (with Peter Turner Winskill, 1891)

References

Further reading

Frederic Arnold Lees. (1904). Dr Frederic Richard Lees: A Biography. London.
Judith Anne Pitney. (1970). Frederic Richard Lees: The Teetotal Philosopher. University of Wisconsin.

1815 births
1897 deaths
British vegetarianism activists
English temperance activists
People associated with the Vegetarian Society